Jalmenus is a genus of butterflies in the family Lycaenidae.The genus is endemic to Australia.

Species
Jalmenus aridus Graham & Moulds, 1988 - inland hairstreak
Jalmenus clementi Druce, 1902 - turquoise hairstreak
Jalmenus daemeli Semper, 1879 - Dämel's blue, emerald hairstreak
Jalmenus eichhorni Staudinger, 1888 - northern hairstreak, northern imperial blue
Jalmenus eubulus Miskin, 1876
Jalmenus evagoras (Donovan, 1805) - common imperial blue, imperial hairstreak
Jalmenus icilius Hewitson, 1865 - amethyst hairstreak, Icilius blue
Jalmenus ictinus Hewitson, 1865 - Ictinus blue, stencilled hairstreak
Jalmenus inous Hewitson, 1865 - Inous blue, varied hairstreak
Jalmenus lithochroa Waterhouse, 1903 - lithochroa blue, Waterhouse's hairstreak
Jalmenus pseudictinus Kerr & Macqueen, 1967

External links

Theclinae
Lycaenidae genera
Taxa named by Jacob Hübner